Electric Loco Shed, Kalyan is an electric engine shed located in Kalyan in the Indian state of Maharashtra. Located north-east of Kalyan Junction railway station, it falls under the Mumbai CR railway division.

History 

Electric Loco Shed Kalyan has the distinction of being the prime mover of Mumbai Division of central railway for the last 93 years. The shed was established on 28 November 1928 under Great Indian Peninsula Railway & is the first Electric Loco Shed in India. Kalyan Loco Shed is the only shed in India to hold widest variety of locos. Currently shed handles 225 locos includes 50 Nos. of WCAM-3, 20 Nos. of WCAM-2, 12 Nos. of WCAG-1, 55 Nos. of WAG-7, 2 Nos. of WCM-6, 69 Nos. of WAG-9, 78 Nos. of WAP-7 respectively. It formerly held the WCG-2 DC electric locomotives.

Activities 
Apart from regular Preventive Maintenance Schedule i.e. IA, IB, IC, TOH & IOH, Kalyan Loco Shed is also carrying out the following activities.

 Maintenance & operation of Accident Relief Train
 Maintenance & operation of Self Propelled ART
 Re-discing of wheel sets.

Milestones

Locomotives

Loco holding images

External links 
 
 Central Railway - Official Website

References

Kalyan
Rail transport in Maharashtra
Transport in Kalyan-Dombivli
1928 establishments in India